Maine is a state located in Northeastern United States. According to the 2010 United States Census, Maine is the 9th least populous state, with 1,372,247 inhabitants, and the 12th smallest by land area spanning  of land. Maine is divided into 16 counties and contains 483 municipalities consisting of cities, towns, and plantations.

As of 2022, Maine has 23 incorporated cities, 430 towns, and 30 plantations, listed in the below tables.



List of cities 

The list, for each city, shows the population in 2010, the population estimate of 2019, the growth/shrinking percentage between the three, and the date of incorporation as a city.

List of towns 

This is a list of incorporated towns in Maine presented in a table sortable by name, county, or population.

List of plantations 

In Maine, a plantation is an organized form of municipal self-government similar to but with less power than a town or a city. One difference is that plantations cannot make local ordinances. Unlike towns or cities, with few exceptions, this type of municipality usually includes the word Plantation as part of its full name, which is also commonly used locally. There are some exceptions such as Monhegan Island Plantation, which is most commonly known as Monhegan.

See also
 List of places in Maine
 List of counties in Maine
 List of unorganized territories in Maine
 Minor civil division
 Township
 List of cities in the United States
 New England town
 List of New England towns

References

External links

 Maine Local Government county, city and town search

Maine
municipalities
 
Maine